Soul of the Ultimate Nation (often abbreviated as S.U.N.) was a fantasy-based massive multiplayer online role-playing game (MMORPG) produced by Webzen, a Korean-based company. It was operated in South Korea by Webzen and in mainland China by The9. The game was launched in Taiwan on April 19, and in China on May 24, 2007 as a paid online service and closed on July 3, 2013.

In December 2005, Webzen sold an export contract for the game to The9 for $13 million USD in total, which at the time was the largest single export transaction in Korea's online game history.  In 2006, S.U.N. was selected as the most anticipated online game at the 2nd Annual ‘Best Online Game Selection’ in China. In a survey by Gametrics, the largest Internet cafe survey website in Korea, S.U.N. was ranked among the top 10 games in Korean Internet cafes. Also, S.U.N. received the award at the Digital Contents Awards by Ministry of Information and Communication and SK Telecom  in 2006.

Gameplay 
Like some other MMORPGs, S.U.N. utilised the "hack and slash" way. Players were part of a rebel group known as "The Guidance". Items could be strengthened and upgraded throughout the game play of SUN. For large-scale combat such as siege warfare, Soul of the Ultimate Nation utilised a combat map with partitions that divided players into multiple fields each containing 20-40 characters; the outcome of each battle having direct effects on the combat occurring on other fields. SUN also allowed players to strategically set the stage for battles by choosing different types of maps, entry numbers, degrees of difficulty and types of monsters for a customized game play experience. SUN had three types of specified maps using a zone map system. Players started the game in a city and had to create zones to play the game. In terms of maps, the mission maps were the primary places where players can solve missions. The hunting maps were for tracking down monsters to level up characters, gather items and acquire in-game money. The quest maps were used to fulfill quests and to help users better understand the overall scenario of the game.

The game underwent four stages of beta from September 2005 to May 2006 in South Korea, and received high marks from gamers. S.U.N. Taiwan moved from closed beta to open beta on 20 December 2006. The final open beta allowed game developers to improve the field maps, add a competitive hunting system and a mission ranking system.

SUN Korea adopted F2P mode and item mall model on November 14, 2006. NHN USA Corp., the publisher of SUN in North America which made a license agreement with Webzen on May 21, 2009.

S.U.N. was available for distribution and operation in North America through the gaming corporation ijji. A beta test of Webzen's version was held from October 14, 2009 until October 16, 2009. Webzen's S.U.N. version came out October 21, 2009.

Battle Zone System

Under the Battle Zone System, players could create "rooms" for battles, be it against monsters or other players. Players had to talk with a specific non-player character (NPC) in each town to create such rooms. They could select different types of maps, areas, set the entry numbers, degree of difficulty and types of monsters within the map. For a players vs. monsters map, players formed a party and usually had to proceed through the map to complete certain map objectives, such as killing the boss monster. At the end of the stage, experience and loot were shared among the participants.

Character classes
Like in Webzen's earlier MMORPG, MU Online, players had a selection of five different character classes: Dragon Knight, Berserker, Valkyrie, Elementalist and Shadow. For each class height, hairstyle, and face could be picked from several alternatives, but each class had a predefined gender. However, since Episode 2's release, each class was available to another character. For example, a Dragon Knight could be a Valkyrie, and an Elementalist had the possibility of being a Shadow; all of this is in terms of skill set and play-style.

Soundtrack
The soundtrack for this MMORPG was composed by Howard Shore.

References

External links
 S.U.N. Official Korean website
 S.U.N. Official America/Europe website
 S.U.N. Official Taiwan website
 S.U.N. Official Russia website
 S.U.N. Official S.E. Asia website
 S.U.N. Official Japan website

2006 video games
Massively multiplayer online role-playing games
2007 video games
Fantasy massively multiplayer online role-playing games
Ijji
Inactive massively multiplayer online games
Products and services discontinued in 2013
Video games developed in South Korea
Windows games
Windows-only games
Webzen games
The9 games